Amadeus, Count of Neuchâtel (died 1285) was a son of Count Rudolph III and his wife, Sybille of Montbéliard. In 1272, he succeeded his father as Count of Neuchâtel. However, his brothers questioned the legitimacy of his sole rule and demanded a share of his inheritance. They asked the grandfather  to arbitrate the dispute. Theodoric deviated from the usual practice in those days, and decided that the county should be regarded as an indivisible entity. He awarded the county to Amadeus, but acknowledged that his brothers were entitled to a share. However, the brothers would have to swear allegiance to Amadeus.

Marriage and issue 
Amadeus was married to Jordanna, the daughter of Count Ulrich of Arberg. They had the following children:
 Rudolph IV, his successor
 Amadeus, a knight
 Guillemette, later Countess of Montbéliard, married Reginald of Burgundy
 Adelaide, married Ulrich of Porta
 Sibylle
 Nicola, a cleric

Counts of Neuchâtel
13th-century births
1285 deaths
13th-century nobility